Egon Schulte (born January 7, 1955 in Heggen (Kreis Olpe), Germany) is a mathematician and a professor of Mathematics at Northeastern University in Boston. He received his Ph.D. in 1980 from the Technical University of Dortmund; his doctoral dissertation was on Regular Incidence Complexes (abstract regular polytopes).

Selected publications

External links

 Egon Schulte, Professor, Northeastern University, Department of Mathematics
 Schulte Publications 1984 - 2010

Living people
1955 births
Northeastern University faculty
Combinatorialists
Technical University of Dortmund alumni
People from Olpe (district)